Cesio is a comune (municipality) in the Province of Imperia in the Italian region Liguria, located about  southwest of Genoa and about  northwest of Imperia.  
 
Cesio borders the following municipalities: Caravonica, Casanova Lerrone, Chiusanico, Pieve di Teco, Testico and Vessalico.

References

External links

Official website

Cities and towns in Liguria